Kenneth Greatorex (born 16 August 1936) is an English former professional rugby league footballer who played in the 1950s and 1960s. He played at club level for Featherstone Rovers (Heritage № 399).

Playing career
Greatorex made his début for Featherstone Rovers on Saturday 11 October 1958.

Challenge Cup Final appearances
Greatorex played , i.e. number 5, in Featherstone Rovers' 17-12 victory over Barrow in the 1966–67 Challenge Cup Final during the 1966–67 season at Wembley Stadium, London on Saturday 13 May 1967, in front of a crowd of 76,290.

County Cup Final appearances
Greatorex played right-, i.e. number 3, in Featherstone Rovers' 15-14 victory over Hull F.C. in the 1959–60 Yorkshire County Cup Final during the 1959–60 season at Headingley Rugby Stadium, Leeds on Saturday 31 October 1959, played , i.e. number 2, in the 0-10 defeat by Halifax in the 1963–64 Yorkshire County Cup Final during the 1963–64 season at Belle Vue, Wakefield on Saturday 2 November 1963, and played right- in the 12-25 defeat by Hull Kingston Rovers in the 1966–67 Yorkshire County Cup Final during the 1966–67 season at Headingley Rugby Stadium, Leeds on Saturday 15 October 1966.

Testimonial match
Greatorex's benefit season at Featherstone Rovers took place during the 1968–69 season.

References

External links

Search for "Greatorex" at rugbyleagueproject.org
A FEATHERSTONE ROVERS BLOG: Featherstone & Castleford United

1936 births
Living people
English rugby league players
Featherstone Rovers players
Rugby league wingers
Rugby league players from Wakefield